Gundurimba Shire was a local government area in the Northern Rivers region of New South Wales, Australia.

Gundurimba Shire was proclaimed on 7 March 1906, one of 134 shires created after the passing of the Local Government (Shires) Act 1905. 

The shire offices were in Lismore. 

Gundurimba Shire was abolished on 1 January 1977 and its area merged along with part of Terania Shire into the City of Lismore.

References

Former local government areas of New South Wales
1906 establishments in Australia
1977 disestablishments in Australia